Kalapa, according to Buddhist legend, is the capital city of the Kingdom of Shambhala where the Kulika King is said to reign on a lion throne. It is said to be an exceedingly beautiful city with a sandalwood pleasure grove containing a huge three-dimensional Kalachakra mandala made by King Suchandra.
	  
Kalapa Court, the palace of the king, stands on a platform of pearl in the center. The building is nine stories high. The roof and floor of the king's chamber consist of crystal plants that radiate heat for warmth. The city is shaped like a square and surrounded by walls made of ruby. There are four gates for entry made of precious stones. There are 31 pavilions each of which is surrounded by gardens and streams.

There are two half-moon shaped lakes on two sides of Kalapa.

References

External links
 Shambhala, the magic kingdom
 Kalachakra Kalapa Center - Buddhist retreat center in Austria
 THE KALAPA COURT OF SHAMBHALA, Levekunst

Mythological populated places
Shambhala vision
Tibetan Buddhist mythology